In the Star Trek fictional universe, LCARS (an acronym for Library Computer Access/Retrieval System) is a computer operating system.  Within Star Trek chronology, the term was first used in the Star Trek: The Next Generation series.

Production
The LCARS graphical user interface was designed by scenic art supervisor and technical consultant Michael Okuda. The original design concept was influenced by a request from Gene Roddenberry that the instrument panels not have a great deal of activity on them. This minimalized look was designed to give a sense that the technology was much more advanced than in the original Star Trek. The early display panels were made out of colored plexiglass with light behind them, a technique that can produce complex-looking displays cheaply. At times, pieces of green material were used on control panels so that complex animations could be added in post-production via the chroma key process.

As the show progressed, use of animations increased. Most were displayed on video equipment built into the sets. Depending on the camera angle, the animated LCARS graphic might appear curved due to the use of cathode-ray tube (CRT) screens. As flat-panel display technology became available, set design moved away from the CRT displays, giving the animated LCARS graphics a closer appearance to the static graphics.

On Star Trek: The Next Generation, many of the buttons were labeled with the initials of members of the production crew and were referred to as "Okudagrams."

When Michael Okuda was asked about the design of the LCARS display, he responded "I came up with the LCARS style in part because of Gene Roddenberry's directive that he wanted his new Enterprise to be so advanced that it looked simple and clean. The other part of the LCARS style was that it had to be something that could be manufactured quickly and easily on a television budget."

PADD

In the Star Trek franchise, the LCARS interface is often seen used on a PADD (Personal Access Display Device), a hand-held computer. Both the hardware and software components of TNG displays were the result of TNG design staff's familiarity with the Ubiquitous computing project at PARC (Palo Alto Research Center). This led to the seamless depiction of three categories of interactive display: large boards mounted on bulkheads and work consoles, medium-sized easily portable padds, and small-sized tabs such as the NextGen communicator, informational readouts on phasers, etc.

PADDs of various designs and interfaces are used throughout the Star Trek universe by such species as Humans, Klingons, Romulans, Vulcans, Andorians, Bajorans, and Cardassians. They are common to cultures even as distant as the Delta Quadrant.

Contemporary comparisons
At , similarly sized modern tablets such as the Nexus 7, Amazon Fire, BlackBerry PlayBook, and iPad Mini have been compared with the PADD. Several mobile apps were created  which offered an LCARS-style interface.

Legal
CBS Television Studios claims to hold the copyright on LCARS. Google was sent a DMCA letter to remove the Android app called Tricorder since its use of the LCARS interface was un-licensed. The application was later re-uploaded under a different title, but it was removed again.

References

External links

Star Trek terminology
Fictional software
Operating systems